Offit is a surname. Notable people with the surname include:

Kenneth Offit (born 1955), American cancer geneticist and oncologist
Morris W. Offit (born  1937), American businessman
Paul Offit (born 1951), American pediatrician
Sidney Offit (born 1928), American writer